Mark Thomas Esper (born April 26, 1964) is an American politician and manufacturing executive who served as the 27th United States secretary of defense from 2019 to 2020. A member of the Republican Party, he had previously served as the 23rd U.S. secretary of the Army from November 2017 to July 2019.

A West Point graduate, Esper joined the United States Army and saw combat during the Gulf War as an infantry officer with the 101st Airborne Division. Esper subsequently served in the 82nd Airborne Division and the Army National Guard. After leaving military service, he served as chief of staff at the Heritage Foundation; a congressional staffer; a deputy assistant secretary of defense; and a senior executive for the Aerospace Industries Association, the Global Intellectual Property Center, and the U.S. Chamber of Commerce. Immediately before joining the Trump administration, Esper lobbied for defense contractor Raytheon as its vice president of government relations.

In 2017, he joined the Trump administration as the 23rd secretary of the Army. In 2019, Esper was named acting defense secretary; he was confirmed shortly afterwards as the 27th defense secretary by the United States Senate with a vote of 90–8. He was fired by President Donald Trump by tweet on November 9, 2020.

Early life and education
Esper was born on April 26, 1964, in Uniontown, Pennsylvania as the son of Pauline "Polly" Reagan and Thomas Joseph Esper. His father was a member of the Maronite Church. His paternal grandfather was an immigrant from Lebanon, and his uncle was war journalist George Esper.

Esper graduated from Laurel Highlands High School outside Uniontown, Pennsylvania, in 1982. He received his Bachelor of Science in engineering from the United States Military Academy in 1986. Esper was a dean's list student at West Point and received the Douglas MacArthur Award for Leadership. He received a master's degree in public administration from Harvard Kennedy School in 1995 and a doctorate in public policy from George Washington University in 2008.

Career

Esper served as an infantry officer with the 101st Airborne Division and deployed with the "Screaming Eagles" for the Gulf War. His battalion was part of the famous "left hook" that led to the defeat of the Iraqi Army. He later commanded an airborne rifle company in Europe and served as an Army fellow at the Pentagon. Esper served on active duty for more than ten years before moving to the Army National Guard and later the Army Reserve, rising to the rank of lieutenant colonel. Esper is a recipient of the Department of Defense Medal for Distinguished Public Service. Among his military awards and decorations are the Legion of Merit, Bronze Star Medal, Kuwait Liberation Medal, and the Combat Infantryman Badge.

Esper was chief of staff at the Heritage Foundation, a conservative think tank, from 1996 to 1998. From 1998 to 2002, Esper served as a senior professional staffer for the Senate Foreign Relations Committee and the Senate Governmental Affairs Committee. He was also a senior policy advisor and legislative director for U.S. Senator Chuck Hagel. He was policy director for the House Armed Services Committee from 2001 to 2002. From 2002 to 2004, Esper served in George W. Bush's administration as deputy assistant secretary of defense for negotiations policy, where he was responsible for a broad range of nonproliferation, arms control and international security issues. He was director for national security affairs for the U.S. Senate under Majority Leader Bill Frist from 2004 to 2006.

Esper was executive vice president at the Aerospace Industries Association in 2006 and 2007. From September 2007 to February 2008, Esper served as national policy director to U.S. Senator Fred Thompson in his 2008 presidential campaign. From 2008 to 2010, Esper served as executive vice president of the Global Intellectual Property Center and vice president for Europe and Eurasia at the U.S. Chamber of Commerce. He was hired as vice president of government relations at defense contractor Raytheon in July 2010. Esper was recognized as a top corporate lobbyist by The Hill in 2015 and 2016. Esper's departure from Raytheon included a deferred compensation package after 2022.

Secretary of the Army
President Donald Trump announced his intention to nominate Esper as Secretary of the Army on June 19, 2017. He was Trump's third nominee for the position, following the withdrawals of Vincent Viola and Mark E. Green. He was confirmed to this post by an 89–6 vote of the U.S. Senate on November 15, 2017 and sworn in on November 20, 2017.

During his confirmation hearing before the Senate Armed Services Committee in November 2017, Esper said that he would have three priorities as Army secretary: readiness, modernization (including of the military acquisition process and personnel system), and efficiency.

Transgender servicemembers
President Trump tweeted his objections to transgender servicemembers in July 2017, and, under his Presidential Memorandum of August 25, 2017, he required the Department of Defense to produce a report on this subject. Esper was asked by reporters in February 2018 whether soldiers had concerns about serving beside openly transgender individuals. He replied: "It really hasn't come up."

After Esper was nominated to become Secretary of Defense, he said that he had met several transgender service members and was impressed with them. Nonetheless, he supported Directive-type Memorandum-19-004, which required service members to meet cisgendered standards associated with their biological sex. Esper claimed it was not a "blanket ban" on transgender service members but rather a policy to ensure that service members are deployable worldwide and can meet military standards without "special accommodations." He said that service members would be individually assessed and that some would be offered waivers to continue serving. In this interview, Esper cited the Defense Department's February 2018 report to support his views.

Secretary of Defense

Temporary appointment and nomination

Trump announced the appointment of Esper as Acting Secretary of Defense on June 18, 2019, after Acting Secretary Patrick Shanahan decided to withdraw his nomination. Four days later, it was announced that Trump would nominate Esper to serve as Secretary of Defense in a permanent capacity. On July 15, 2019, the White House formally sent his nomination to the Senate. Following his formal nomination, Esper was replaced as Acting Defense Secretary by Secretary of the Navy Richard Spencer, as the Federal Vacancies Reform Act of 1998 prevented Esper from serving as acting secretary while his nomination was formally under consideration. During that period, Esper reverted to his position as Secretary of the Army. The Senate Committee on Armed Services scheduled a hearing on the nomination for the next day. On July 22, 2019, the Senate voted 85–6 to invoke cloture on his nomination. On July 23, 2019, his nomination was confirmed by a vote of 90–8.

Tenure

Esper has said that his operating positions as Secretary of Defense would be apolitical, in keeping with the National Defense Strategy formulated in 2018 by his predecessor Jim Mattis.

Esper met with his European counterparts in February 2020 to discuss basing options for a new United States Army headquarters in Europe, bearing the name "V Corps" that had originally been established in World War I but was inactivated while stationed in Germany in 2013.  Esper stated the new headquarters was needed to improve military coordination among NATO partners.

In response to the National Defense Authorization Act for Fiscal Year 2020, which included $738 billion in defense spending, Esper said: "I’m good with those dollars. No complaints." Esper provided a framework for members of Congress to insert a proviso in the annual National Defense Authorization Act (NDAA) which guides the naming of military installations.

Firing of the Secretary of the Navy 
On November 24, 2019, during a dispute regarding whether Navy SEAL Eddie Gallagher would be stripped of his Trident pin, Esper fired the United States Secretary of the Navy, Richard Spencer. The Department of Defense attributed the firing to Spencer privately proposing to the White House (without informing Esper and contrary to Spencer's public position) an arrangement to let Gallagher retire while keeping his Trident pin. On November 25, Esper stated that Trump had ordered him to stop the Navy from conducting a peer review regarding Gallagher's right to wear the pin. Esper said he previously supported the peer review, but followed Trump's order. Meanwhile, Trump cited the Gallagher case as the primary reason for Esper's firing of Spencer, while also citing "large cost overruns" in the Navy.

Withdrawal of U.S. forces from Afghanistan 
On February 29, 2020, the Trump administration signed a conditional peace agreement with the Taliban, which called for the withdrawal of American troops from Afghanistan within 14 months, if the Taliban uphold the terms of the agreement. In May 2020, Esper said: "I don’t put a timeline on it. We have a timeline of May of next year but that timeline was premised on everything moving at a set pace."

Withdrawal of U.S. forces from Germany 

In 2020, Trump directed the Pentagon to remove 11,800 of the nearly 35,000 American troops stationed in Germany. Trump said the move was partially influenced by U.S. frustration with Nord Stream 2 gas pipeline from Russia to Germany, owned by Russia's Gazprom; cited Germany's unwillingness to spend more on defense in support of NATO and accused Germany of being "very delinquent"; and said of Germany, "They make a fortune off the troops. They build cities around our troops. ... We'll let ourselves get rich first." While Trump framed the withdrawal as an act of retribution against the Germans, Esper cited a different rationale, framing the decision in strategic terms, although he acknowledged that Trump's anger at German military spending "accelerated" the process. Esper agreed with Trump that Germany was a "rich country" that "can and should pay more for its defense."

The idea for a significant reduction of troops from Germany originated from the White House, where it was pushed by two Trump advisers, Robert C. O'Brien and Richard Grenell. Defense Department officials were largely cut off from the decision making, and they feared that the partial withdrawal from Germany would inhibit regional defenses against Russia. Esper had significant concerns about the plan, but avoided publicly criticizing it and worked to implement Trump's directive. Esper reportedly believed that Trump's demand for speedy troop withdrawal was logistically impossible; the Associated Press reported that "A number of NATO diplomats and officials have suggested the pullout—which would be costly and might not even be logistically possible before the U.S. elections in November—probably won't happen."

Trump's announcement of the withdrawal of U.S. troops was made without consultation with Germany or other NATO allies. In June 2020, Esper traveled to NATO headquarters in Brussels to meet with NATO secretary general Jens Stoltenberg and to reassure him that the U.S. would not announce any further troop movements or reductions without first consulting with NATO allies.

In June 2020, Trump said at a press conference with Polish President Andrzej Duda that the United States planned to move some U.S. troops from Germany to Poland. Esper backed Trump's decision, saying that the Pentagon wants to send more troops to the Baltic states, Poland and Romania.

COVID-19 pandemic
In late January 2020, as the coronavirus spread, Esper said he was "not tracking" its spread, as the Trump administration downplayed the risks of the disease.

As the coronavirus outbreak turned into a pandemic in early March 2020, Esper directed overseas commanders of U.S. forces to check with him before taking actions to protect U.S. troops, lest they contradict the Trump administration's messaging on the coronavirus. Esper said that "My No. 1 priority remains to protect our forces and their families." The following week, Esper directed the deployment of two Navy hospital ships, the USNS Comfort and the USNS Mercy, to take pressure off New York and Los Angeles hospitals as they coped with the pandemic. Esper also authorized the Defense Department to provide civilian health authorities with five million respirator masks and 2,000 specialized ventilators.

In early April 2020, Acting Secretary of the Navy Thomas Modly removed Navy Captain Brett Crozier from command of the aircraft carrier USS Theodore Roosevelt after Crozier pleaded with Navy leaders to move more quickly to in the face of a coronavirus outbreak on the ship. Esper defended Modly's decision, though he conceded that he had not read Crozier's letter calling for help. Within days, widespread condemnation led Modly to resign. Esper named James McPherson, Under Secretary of the Army, to replace him.

On April 14, 2020, Esper announced the extension of a travel freeze on military members and Department of Defense civilian employees. The original order to stop movement was to last for 60 days, but Esper said that additional time was needed to stop the spread of the virus. Several days following the announcement, Esper extended the freeze through June 30, 2020.

Lawmakers, retired officers and experts criticized Esper's response to the coronavirus, describing it as slow and indecisive. According to Politico, there was discontent within the Department of Defense about Esper's leadership on the issue. Esper primarily left it up to local commanders in terms of how they would respond to the pandemic, which resulted in uneven responses. Several military officials said there was a lack of top-down planning and guidance on important decisions. In a letter in late April 2020, ten Democratic senators called Esper's leadership "disjointed and slow", saying that DOD's civilian leadership had "failed to act sufficiently, quickly, and has often prioritized [combat] readiness at the expense of the health of service members and their families." A Pentagon spokesman defended DoD's handling of the pandemic.

In May 2020, at an event marking the 75th anniversary of the Allied victory in Europe, Esper was criticized for interacting with seven World War II veterans who were between the ages of 96 and 100 without wearing a facemask. In response to critics, the administration said that Esper and the veterans were tested before the event.

George Floyd protests and Insurrection Act 

According to multiple reports, on June 1, 2020, amid nationwide civil unrest arising from the murder of George Floyd by police, Trump at one point demanded the deployment of 10,000 active-duty troops to the streets of Washington and other U.S. cities in a heated meeting in the Oval Office with Esper and Chairman of the Joint Chiefs of Staff Mark Milley, who opposed this request. Trump's spokesperson Alyssa Farah and Attorney General William Barr denied that Trump had requested the deployment of 10,000 active-duty troops, with Barr saying instead that Trump wanted troops on "standby."

Esper participated in a June 1 call with state governors, Trump, and Barr, in which Trump urged governors to "dominate" and use aggressive methods. During the call, Esper said, "I think the sooner that you mass and dominate the battlespace, the quicker this dissipates and we can get back to the right normal." Esper's suggestion that American cities were a "battlespace" prompted significant criticism, including from former Joint Chiefs of Staff chairman Martin E. Dempsey and former Special Operations Command head Raymond A. Thomas. At a subsequent press conference, Esper said that he did not intend the use of the term to focus "on people, and certainly not on our fellow Americans."

On June 1, Esper walked alongside Trump to a photo op in front of St. John's Episcopal Church outside the White House; just prior, police in riot gear and mounted police cleared protestors who started throwing bricks and other projectiles after police began using smoke and flash grenades and a chemical irritant spray   from Lafayette Square, clearing a path for Trump, Esper and several other Trump administration officials. Esper's participation in the photo op was criticized by a number of retired senior military officers.

Two days later, at a Pentagon press conference, Esper said, regarding the Lafayette Park photo op, that, "Well, I did know that we were going to the church. I was not aware of a photo op was happening," adding, "And look, I do everything I can to try to stay apolitical and try and stay out of situations that may appear political. And sometimes I’m successful at doing that, and sometimes I’m not as successful, but my aim is to keep the department out of politics to stay apolitical."

Esper broke with Trump by publicly opposing invocation of the Insurrection Act of 1807 and the deployment of active-duty troops in American cities, saying that "the National Guard is best suited for performing domestic support to civil authorities ... I say this not only as Secretary of Defense, but also as a former soldier, and a former member of the National Guard. The option to use active duty forces in a law enforcement role should only be used as a matter of last resort, and only in the most urgent and dire of situations. We are not in one of those situations now. I do not support invoking the Insurrection Act." Esper took steps in the following days to further de-escalate the situation, removing weapons and ammunition from the National Guard, and returning troops to their home bases without notifying the White House. Trump reportedly considered firing Esper over the situation.

On June 6, the House Armed Services Committee (HASC) invited Esper and Milley to testify before the committee regarding the events of June 1; they declined. Chief spokesman Jonathan Hoffman said in statement that the pair "have not 'refused' to testify'" and that the department's “legislative affairs team remains in discussion" with the committee. HASC chairman Representative Adam Smith later acknowledged in a written letter that Esper and Milley may have been prevented from appearing by the White House. Esper and Milley subsequently agreed to appear before the House Armed Services Committee on July 9.  In the meantime, on June 8, Army Secretary Ryan McCarthy briefed the committee on the presence of the National Guard in Washington, D.C. on June 1, which was during the protests.

Days later, Esper and Milley responded in detail to a series of questions asked of them by HASC chairman Smith regarding events during the week of June 1. Smith later said the Pentagon had been "reasonably cooperative" in providing witnesses to the committee amid logistical issues during the coronavirus pandemic.

Addressing diversity and inclusion in the U.S. military 
Amid the nationwide racial unrest beginning in late May 2020, Esper directed Pentagon civilian and uniformed leaders to come up with ideas that could be used to quickly improve equal opportunity, diversity, and inclusion in the Armed Forces; established an internal Defense Board on Diversity and Inclusion in the Military to recommend ways to increase racial diversity and ensure equal opportunity across all ranks, especially in the officer corps, by December 2020; and created a Defense Advisory Committee on Diversity and Inclusion in the Armed Services, mirroring the Defense Advisory Committee on Women in the Services.

On June 18, 2020, Esper said that while the Defense Department has often led on issues of race and discrimination, he cited underrepresentation of minorities in the officer ranks as a particular problem.

Basic Exchange and Cooperation Agreement for Geo-Spatial Cooperation 
In October 2020, Esper and U.S. Secretary of State Mike Pompeo met with Indian Minister of External Affairs Subrahmanyam Jaishankar and Minister of Defense Rajnath Singh to sign the Basic Exchange and Cooperation Agreement on Geospatial Cooperation (BECA), which facilitates the sharing of sensitive information and intelligence—including access to highly-accurate nautical, aeronautical, topographical, and geospatial data—between the United States and India. The agreement had been under discussion for over a decade, but previous concerns over information security impelled India's United Progressive Alliance (UPA) coalition government to block it.

Firing by Trump and subsequent events
After Trump lost the 2020 presidential election to Joe Biden, Trump launched a months-long effort to subvert the election outcome and remain in power, falsely claiming that the election had been "stolen" from him. In his subsequent memoir, published in 2022, Esper wrote that Trump's effort "was a national embarrassment that undermined our democracy, our credibility, and our leadership on the world stage." 

On November 9, 2020, days after his election loss, Trump tweeted that Esper was "terminated," and that he had been replaced by Christopher C. Miller, the director of the National Counterterrorism Center who would serve as Acting Secretary of Defense. Esper had written his resignation letter four days earlier, when a winner had not yet been determined.

On January 2, 2021, days before the end of Trump's term and the inauguration of Biden, Esper, along with all other living former secretaries of defense published a Washington Post op-ed piece in January 2021 that rebuked Trump's effort to alter the election results, and said there was no role for the military to change them. The group's piece appeared days after Trump ally Michael Flynn, an ex-Army general, and reportedly Trump himself, discussed the possibility of declaring martial law and attempting to stay in power. The group wrote:  "Our elections have occurred. Recounts and audits have been conducted. Appropriate challenges have been addressed by the courts. Governors have certified the results. And the electoral college has voted. The time for questioning the results has passed; the time for the formal counting of the electoral college votes, as prescribed in the Constitution and statute, has arrived." Esper later wrote that Trump's behavior on January 6, when a mob of his supporters, incited by the president, attacked the Capitol and disrupted the counting of the electoral votes, "threatens our democracy."

After the administration

Memoirs, book tour, and Trump criticism
In November 2021, Esper sued the Department of Defense for preventing the publication of parts of his memoir. He dropped the suit three months later; his attorney said DoD had withdrawn "the overwhelming majority" of its objections to material it had deemed classified.

The memoir, A Sacred Oath, was published in May 2022. In it, Esper wrote that the Trump administration's decision-making process was overtaken by concerns about the president's 2020 reelection. He said he considered resigning several times but remained on concerns he would be replaced by a Trump loyalist who was providing dangerous ideas to the president. Esper wrote that Trump asked him at least twice if the Pentagon could "shoot missiles into Mexico to destroy the drug labs" and "no one would know it was us." During the 2020 George Floyd protests, Trump sought to deploy 10,000 active duty troops in Washington, asking Esper about protestors, "Can't you just shoot them?" He wrote Trump's top domestic policy advisor Stephen Miller sought to send 250,000 troops to the southern border on the premise that a large caravan of migrants was en route; Esper wrote he responded the Pentagon did not "have 250,000 troops to send to the border for such nonsense." As White House officials watched a live video feed of the raid that killed Abu Bakr al-Baghdadi, Esper said Miller proposed beheading al-Baghdadi, dipping his head in pig's blood and parading  it around to warn other terrorists. He said he told Miller that would be a war crime; Miller flatly denied the episode occurred. Esper characterized Trump as "an unprincipled person who, given his self-interest, should not be in the position of public service."

Esper gave several interviews in 2022 as part of his book tour. In an interview on Fox & Friends, Esper said that Trump "went too far in too many things." He said he supported the 2021 impeachment of Trump, in which the president was impeached for inciting the January 6 attack on the Capitol, part of a failed bid to overturn Trump's election loss and keep him in power. In an interview on The Late Show with Stephen Colbert, Colbert pressed Esper on why he criticized Trump in his memoirs, but did not criticize Trump while still in office, or inform the public about what was going on. (In his book, Esper recounted Trump proposing to launch missiles into Mexico and suggesting the idea of sending the military to "just shoot" racial-justice demonstrators in the legs; Esper also recounted his fears that Trump would misuse the military by ordering it to seize ballot boxes or otherwise disrupt the 2020 presidential election.) Esper defended himself as a "circuit breaker" against Trump's most dangerous and erratic tendencies.

In an open letter published in September 2022, Esper, along with Jim Mattis (who preceded him as defense secretary under Trump), as well as a bipartisan group of former top U.S. generals and former defense secretaries, said that the failure to commit to a peaceful transfer of power worsened "an extremely adverse environment" for the U.S. military. The 16-point letter did not mention Trump by name, but was a clear critique of Trump and his followers; the signatories wrote: "Military officers swear an oath to support and defend the Constitution, not an oath of fealty to an individual or to an office. It is the responsibility of senior military and civilian leaders to ensure that any order they receive from the president is legal."

Political Views 
Esper has described himself in TV interviews and in his memoir as a "Reagan Republican" who is a "fiscal conservative, social moderate, and defense hawk."

2024 Presidential Election 
Regarding the 2024 Election, Esper said that the GOP needs candidates for President who will pursue traditional conservative policy objectives, grow the GOP base, win elections, put country first, and can unite the American people.  He said that Donald Trump did not meet those criteria for him.  He later added that the country needs a “new generation of leaders” in both parties.

Immigration 
In an interview with CNN, Esper said he believes in border security, describing it as a national security issue and important component of immigration reform. He faulted Congress over many years for its “failure to act” for not developing modern immigration policies. In an interview, Esper said he supports a merit-based immigration system and border security, adding that the latter will be an “important factor” to any immigration reform legislation.

Chinese Spy Balloon 
On January 28, 2023, a Chinese spy balloon entered U.S. airspace near Alaska. It eventually passed through Canadian airspace before re-entering the United States in Montana. The balloon passed over the country for several days, to include over sensitive U.S. military sites. The Biden Administration shot down the spy balloon over the Atlantic Ocean near South Carolina on February 4, 2023. Esper criticized the Administration for not shooting down the spy balloon as soon as it entered U.S. airspace near Alaska in late January, expressing concern about the intelligence information the Chinese could gain from the flight, but supported the White House decision not to do so once it passed over more populated areas. Esper also noted the importance of securing the balloon’s instrumentation package in order to determine its capabilities and assess what exactly they Chinese government was trying to learn.In the aftermath of the 2023 Chinese spy balloon incident, U.S. officials disclosed that three suspected Chinese spy balloons had transited the continental United States during the Trump administration, with the intrusions only discovered sometime after Biden took office in January 2021. Esper said that, while in office, he was unaware of previous incidents of Chinese surveillance balloons in U.S. airspace. The Biden administration offered a briefing to top former Trump officials, including Esper, on the new intelligence.

Other activities 
Esper is currently the Distinguished Chair of the Modern War Institute (MWI) at the U.S. Military Academy at West Point.  

In 2021, Esper was named the first John S. McCain Distinguished Fellow at the McCain Institute for International Leadership, a Washington, D.C.-based think tank; he is also a member of the Institute's Board of Trustees.  

Also in 2021, Esper joined the Board of Directors for the Atlantic Council, and was named co-chair (along with Deborah Lee James) of a commission tasked with making recommendations to the Pentagon reform on improving the Defense Department’s ability "to rapidly absorb commercial technologies" from the private sector in order to enhance the U.S. military's warfighting capabilities.

In April 2022, the Washington-based venture capital firm Red Cell Partners announced that Esper had joined the firm as a Partner and Chairman of its national security practice; he  is also a member of Red Cell’s Board of Directors.

Esper is a frequent guest on news shows such as CNN, CNBC, and Bloomberg, and participates in the professional speaking circuit through the Worldwide Speakers Group.

Awards 
Esper received the George C. Marshall Foundation's Andrew J. Goodpaster Award (2021) and the Reagan Presidential Foundation & Institute's "Peace Through Strength" Award (2022).

Personal life 
Esper married his wife, Leah Lacy, in 1989. The couple have three children.

Books

References

External links

 
 

|-

|-

|-

1964 births
21st-century American businesspeople
21st-century American politicians
American lobbyists
American manufacturing businesspeople
American politicians of Lebanese descent
Businesspeople from Pennsylvania
Harvard Kennedy School alumni
Living people
Military personnel from Pennsylvania
People from Uniontown, Pennsylvania
Raytheon Company people
The Heritage Foundation
Trachtenberg School of Public Policy & Public Administration alumni
Trump administration cabinet members
United States Army colonels
United States Army personnel of the Gulf War
United States congressional aides
United States Military Academy alumni
United States Secretaries of Defense
United States Secretaries of the Army
Virginia Republicans